Las Horquetas is a district of the Sarapiquí canton, in the Heredia province of Costa Rica.

Location 

It is located in the northern region of the country and borders the neighborhoods of Puerto Viejo to the north, Varablanca de Heredia to the south and La Virgen to the west. While to the east it borders with the province of Limón.

Its head, the village of Horquetas, is 16.9 km (16 minutes) to the SE of Puerto Viejo city and 68.5 km (1 hour and 14 minutes) to the NE of San José city, the capital of the nation. Another important and slightly larger village is Rio Frio, which is about 8.5 km to the west (12 minutes).

Geography 
Las Horquetas has an area of  km² and an elevation of  metres.

It presents a mountainous territory in its southwest zone, whereas in direction north and east, the land descends and ends in the plains of Sarapiquí.

Demographics 

For the 2011 census, Las Horquetas had a population of  inhabitants. It is the most populated of the canton, ahead even of  Puerto Viejo y  La Virgen.

Settlements
The district's 37 population centers are:

Horquetas (head of the district)
Bambuzal
Cerro Negro (parte)
Colonia Bambú
Colonia Colegio
Colonia Esperanza
Colonia Huetar
Colonia Nazareth
Colonia Victoria
Colonia Villalobos
Cubujuquí
Chiripa
Fátima
Finca Agua
Finca Zona Siete
Finca Zona Ocho
Finca Zona Diez
Finca Zona Once
Isla
Isla Grande
Isla de Israel
La Conquista
La Chávez
Flaminia
La Vuelta 
Rambla
Pedernales
Platanera
Río Frío (the biggest village)
San Bernardino
San Luis
Santa Clara
Tapa Viento
Ticarí
Tigre
Villa Isabel
Villa Nueva

Economy 

It plays an important role in the area, the extensive cultivation of bananas and pineapples for export purposes, dominating the landscape and being the main source of income for many of its inhabitants.

Horquetas, his head, and the village of Rio Frio, have health and education services. 

Entertainment services are also offered in recreational areas.

In terms of trade, it is remarkable the sale of groceries, shoes, clothes, appliances and various accessories.

Transportation

Road transportation 
The district is covered by the following road routes:
 National Route 4
 National Route 229
 National Route 817

References 

 National Institute of Statistics and Censuses
 Municipality of Sarapiquí

Districts of Heredia Province
Populated places in Heredia Province